Dead Ideas were a Serbian hardcore punk/crossover thrash band from Belgrade.

History 
The band was formed in 1990 by bassist and vocalist Darko Marković, however, after their first live appearance, the band disbanded. The following year, on January, with the female vocalist Jelena Komnenić and guitarist Nemanja Kojić, Marković reformed the band, soon being joined by the drummer Igor Škoro. On April of the same year, the band recorded four songs at the Belgrade Focus studio, released on their debut 7" extended play Welcome To The Abyss by the indie record label Start Today Records.

During May 1992, the band recorded eight new songs at the M studio in Novi Sad, but the recordings were not released due to the band not being able to find a record label. The material was eventually self-released by the band as Dead Ideas Promo Tape, on compact cassette. One of the songs from the recorded material appeared on the various artists compilation Tito Nikada Više!, and two appeared as bonus tracks on their debut album Where To?, again self-released by the band in 1993.

In January 1994, the band recorded the song "Wrong" in the Radio B92 studio after having a successful performance at the Palilula Culture Olympics, released on the various artists compilation Radio Utopia (B92: 1989-1994). The song appeared on the reissue of the debut album Where To? by Silver Cross Records in 1994. With the exception of the track, and two tracks from the promo tape, the band recorded the material at the DA studio in Banovci, produced by the Svarog member Zoran Đuroski.

During 1994, the band performed at a festival held in the Italian town Rovigo, organized to raise funds for restoring the Sarajevo city library. The band also toured Slovenia and Greece. Dead Ideas recordings also appeared on several international various artists compilations, including the Croatian No Border compilation and Sretna mladost, the Greek Independent Vibrations and the Dutch Women against the war.

The band also participated the recording of the movie Geto (Ghetto), starring the Električni Orgazam drummer Goran Čavajda "Čavke", about the Belgrade underground rock scene, which was premiered in 1995. During the Winter of the same year, the band released the Rejection EP, available on both 12" LP and compact cassette, featuring four tracks, released by Silver Cross Records. In the meantime, the band got a new guitar player, Ninoslav Filipović "Nino", as Kojić left the band, forming Eyesburn. Soon after, the band disbanded.

Discography

Studio albums 
 Where To? (1993)

Extended plays 
 Welcome To The Abyss (1991)
 Rejection (1995)

Other appearances 
 Tito nikada više ! (1992)
 It's Up To You... (1994)
 No Border compilation (1994),
 Independent Vibrations (1994)
 Radio Utopia (B92: 1989-1994) (1994)
 Sretna mladost (1994)
 Mi za mir (1995)
 It's All So Quiet On The Eastern Front (1996)
 Nećemo i nedamo (1997)

Videography 
 Geto (1995)

References 

 EX YU ROCK enciklopedija 1960-1997, Janjatović Petar; 
 Dead Ideas at Discogs

External links 
 Dead Ideas at Facebook
 Dead Ideas at Discogs
 Dead Ideas at Last.fm
 Dead Ideas at YouTube
 Dead Ideas at Rateyourmusic
 Dead Ideas at Encyclopedia Metallum

 
 

Serbian hardcore punk groups
Serbian thrash metal musical groups
Crossover thrash groups
Musical groups from Belgrade
Musical groups established in 1991
Musical groups disestablished in 1996
1991 establishments in Serbia